Matiur Rahman (born 2 January 1946) is the editor of Prothom Alo, the second largest circulated Bengali language daily in Bangladesh. He is the recipient of the 2005 Ramon Magsaysay Award in the journalism, literature and creative communication arts category.

Early life
Rahman was born 2 January 1946 in Calcutta to Mohammed Fazlur Rahman, a lawyer, and Lutfunessa Begum. For his secondary education, he attended Nawabpur Government High School and then Dhaka Government College. For his higher education, he attended the University of Dhaka and earned his master's degree in statistics in 1967. While a student, he became a Marxist and was a student leader in East Pakistan Student Union. Later, he was secretly a member of Communist Party of Bangladesh while it was still outlawed.

Career
Rahman entered journalism in 1970 when he became the editor of Ekota, a socialist weekly. For five years during the 1970s, he also published the Bangladesh edition of the journal World Marxist Review. He left that position after 21 years and after the fall of the East Bloc. After he left Ekota, he worked as a journalist for newspaper Ajker Kagoj. In February 1992, he partnered with others to found Bhorer Kagoj, which he edited for the next six years. After Saber Hossain Chowdhury joined the cabinet of the Awami League government, Rahman felt pressured to shape the newspaper's stance in accordance with the ruling party and this led to his resignation. In 1998, he founded Prothom Alo, a daily newspaper.

On 12 February 2013, Rahman was wounded from broken glass while in his car when Jamaat-Shibir workers were rioting and vandalising cars.

He was elected president of the Newspaper Owners' Association of Bangladesh in June 2014.

References

Living people
1946 births
People from Kolkata
Bangladeshi journalists
Bangladeshi newspaper editors
Ramon Magsaysay Award winners
 Journalists from West Bengal